Kenneth Lipper is a prominent figure in the arts, the world of finance, and government. He served as New York City's Deputy Mayor under Mayor Ed Koch. Lipper was a general partner at Lehman Brothers and Salomon Brothers. He was Adjunct Professor at Columbia School of International Affairs in the field of international economics. Lipper serves as a director of corporations and government agencies. He is Chairman of Lipper & Co, an investment bank and investment management company, and also serves as Chairman of the Board of Lippmann Enterprises LLC, a cosmetics company. In November 2010, after winning a civil class action, Lipper was awarded more than $15 million in indemnification, because as a New York State Supreme Court judge's findings noted, "none of the investigations and claims asserted against [Lipper] had resulted in a finding that he had engaged in 'negligence, malfeasance or a violation of applicable law.'" In 2013, Governor Andrew Cuomo nominated, and the New York State Senate confirmed, Lipper as a member of the Board of Commissioners of the Port Authority of New York and New Jersey, the Port Authority's governing body. Lipper won an Academy Award in 1998 for producing the Best Documentary Feature. He wrote the novelizations of the films Wall Street and City Hall, and also co-wrote the original screenplay for City Hall. Lipper produced the films City Hall, The Winter Guest, and The Last Days, and worked as chief technical adviser on Wall Street. He is the co-founder and co-publisher of Lipper Viking Penguin, a biography series.

Early life and education
Born to a Jewish family, Lipper earned his B.A. (Phi Beta Kappa) at Columbia College of Columbia University, his J.D. at Harvard Law School, his LL.M. at NYU and did postgraduate work in law and economics at the University of Paris. Lipper was initiated into Zeta Beta Tau Fraternity's Delta Chapter at Columbia University in 1959.

Career
Thereafter he was an associate with a Wall Street law firm for a year before serving as director of industry policy for the Office of Foreign Direct Investment in Washington, D.C. He has been associate and partner of Lehman Brothers (1969–75) and managing director and partner at Salomon Brothers (1976–82) before being recruited by Mayor Ed Koch for his position as deputy mayor in charge of the budget, taxation, and economic development.

In the late 1980s, Lipper founded the investment firm Lipper & Company, which managed more than $5 billion on behalf of institutions and high-net-worth individuals. The firm's investment banking division advised on billions of dollars of mergers and acquisitions, and was ranked the 13th largest M&A firm in 1992. Financial World Magazine ranked Lipper as the 40th highest earner on Wall Street for 1993 and 1994.

He has taught at Columbia's School of International and Public Affairs for many years and serves on the school's advisory board. His proposals for investing in America's cities by developing and supporting the entrepreneurial class have gained wide public attention. He is considered a balanced government reformist.

From 2003 to 2006, Lipper served as Senior Executive Vice President at Cushman & Wakefield, Inc.

On June 21, 2011, Lipper appeared at Bloomberg's High Yield Conference in West Hollywood, California, where he discussed his opinions about the stock and bond markets, and government debt.

On December 7, 2011, Lipper appeared on Fox TV's "Good Day New York," where he discussed unemployment and economic development.

On July 26, 2012, Lipper gave a speech to Group FMG, a global digital marketing organization, and spoke about a variety of issues from US budget and taxation policy to thoughts and forecasts of the European Fiscal Crisis.

The arts
Lipper triumphed in the publishing world with the success of his novel Wall Street, adapted from Oliver Stone's award-winning film of the same name, for which Lipper himself served as technical advisor and in which he had a brief cameo. His experience in government was the inspiration for another film, 1996's City Hall, starring Al Pacino, for which he served as producer and co-wrote the screenplay; he also write the novelization. Lipper appeared on Charlie Rose in 1996 to discuss his novel and movie City Hall. He was also producer of The Winter Guest, starring Emma Thompson, and the Holocaust documentary The Last Days, for which he won an Academy Award.

Philanthropy
Lipper has endowed scholarships in the name of his mother, Sally Lipper, at Harvard, Columbia, Princeton, and Israel's Weizmann Institute.

In 1994, Lipper gifted $3.2 million to Harvard to establish a chair in Holocaust Studies. When Harvard refused to fill the position, Lipper transferred the money to Harvard Medical School.

In 1995 Mr Lipper created the Jerome Lipper multiple myeloma centre at Dana Farber cancer institute, one of the leading cancer research and treatment centres in the United States.

Personal life
In 2000, he divorced his wife, Dr. Evelyn Gruss, the daughter of financier and philanthropist Joseph S. Gruss; they have four daughters: Joanna Helene Lipper, Daniella Lipper Coules, Tamara Lipper Smith, and Julie Lipper Wilcox.

Books
Ken Lipper, Wall Street (1987)

Ken Lipper, City Hall (1996)

Ken Lipper, "Born in the Real World: The Two Wall Street Movies", Wall Street: The Collector's Edition (2010)

References

External links

20th-century American novelists
American male novelists
Columbia College (New York) alumni
Columbia University faculty
Harvard Law School alumni
Jewish American novelists
Jewish American philanthropists
New York University School of Law alumni
University of Paris alumni
Living people
20th-century American male writers
Novelists from New York (state)
Year of birth missing (living people)
Deputy mayors of New York City
21st-century American Jews